The International Federation of Chemical, Energy and General Workers' Unions (ICEF) was a global union federation of trade unions.

History
The secretariat was founded in August 1907, as the International Federation of General Factory Workers, but became inactive during World War I.  It was re-established on 27 October 1920 at a conference in Amsterdam, and set up its headquarters at 17 Museumplein in the city.  By 1935, the federation had affiliates in Belgium, Czechoslovakia, Denmark, Finland, France, Hungary, the Netherlands, Norway, Poland, Spain, Sweden, the UK, and Yugoslavia.

The federation held regular sectional conferences for the chemical industry.  Following the collapse of the International Federation of Glass Workers, it added a glass industry section, with its first conference in 1938.  Similarly, the International Federation of Pottery Workers dissolved before World War II, and in 1947, the federation held the first conference of its new pottery industry section.  In 1954, it held a conference for the rubber industry.

In 1950, the federation was renamed as the International Federation of Industrial Organisations and General Workers' Unions (IFF), and then in 1964 it became the International Federation of Chemical and General Workers' Unions (ICF).  At this time, the organisation was in competition with the International Federation of Petroleum and Chemical Workers, but that collapsed in 1976, with many of its affiliates joining the IFCGW, which renamed itself as the International Federation of Chemical, Energy and General Workers' Unions (ICEF).  Membership accordingly rose from four million to 6.3 million by 1992.
In 1995, the ICEF merged with the Miners' International Federation to form the International Federation of Chemical, Energy, Mine and General Workers' Unions.

Leadership

General Secretaries
C. Sorrensen
1920: Roel Stenhuis
1929: Klaas de Jonge
1950: L. M. van Waasdijk
1954: Menzo ter Borch
1964: Charles Levinson
1984: Michael Boggs
1994: Vic Thorpe

Presidents
1920: James O'Grady
1925: August Brey
1933: Robert Nielsen
1945: Mark Hewitson
1950: Carl F. Lindahl
1953: Jim Matthews
1964: Wilhelm Gefeller
1970: Karl Hauenschild
1983: Moss Evans
1986: Nils Kristoffersson
1989: Hermann Rappe

References

Chemical industry trade unions
Energy industry trade unions
Global union federations
Trade unions established in 1907
Trade unions disestablished in 1995